Battle Mountain or Battle Mountains may refer to:

 Battle Mountain (British Columbia), a mountain
 Battle Mountain, Nevada, an unincorporated community and census-designated place
 Battle Mountain Airport, Nevada
 Battle Mountain High School (Nevada)
 Battle Mountains, Nevada, a mountain range
 Battle Mountain, Queensland, the site of a battle in the Kalkadoon Wars 
 Battle Mountain, Virginia, a mountain
 Battle Mountain Forest State Scenic Corridor, a state park in Oregon
 Battle Mountain Formation, a geological formation in Colorado
 Battle Mountain High School (Colorado)
 North Battle Mountain, Nevada, an unincorporated community

See also
 Battle of Battle Mountain, a 1950 engagement between United Nations and North Korean forces during the Korean War
 Downtown Battle Mountain, a 2007 album by Dance Gavin Dance
 Downtown Battle Mountain II, a 2011 album by Dance Gavin Dance
 Battlement Mountain (disambiguation)